Gil Mahalleh (also Romanized as Gīl Maḩalleh) is a village in Baladeh Rural District, Khorramabad District, Tonekabon County, Mazandaran Province, Iran. At the 2006 census, its population was 248, in 67 families.

References 

Populated places in Tonekabon County